Dilawar Malik is a Pakistani television actor and director. He is best known for directing acclaimed project for PTV such as Boota from Toba Tek Singh and Landa Bazar.

Career 
Malik began his career in late 1990s when he directed several television series for PTV including Boota from Toba Tek Singh, written by Khalil-ur-Rehman Qamar. He then directed Landa Bazar in 2002 which was also written by Qamar, became an overnight success. The television series he directed mostly are deeply culturally routed and in most of the times set in the Walled City of Lahore. He  also directed series for satellite television network including Wafa Kaisi Kahan Ka Ishq (2011), Nadamat (2012) and Laal Ishq (2017) which is the sequel of Landa Bazar.

Filmography 
 Boota from Toba Tek Singh
 Landa Bazar
 Wafa Kaisi Kahan Ka Ishq
 Nadamat
 Daray Daray Naina
 Ek Kasak Reh Gayi
 Laal Ishq
 GT Road
 Inteha e Ishq

References 

Year of birth missing (living people)
Living people
Place of birth missing (living people)
Pakistani male television actors
Pakistani television directors